is a former Japanese football player.

Playing career
Shimizu was born in Ehime Prefecture on June 30, 1976. After graduating from Fukuoka University, he joined newly was promoted to J2 League club, Oita Trinita in 1999. Although he played several matches as substitute forward, he could not play many matches and retired end of 1999 season.

Club statistics

References

External links

1976 births
Living people
Fukuoka University alumni
Association football people from Ehime Prefecture
Japanese footballers
J2 League players
Oita Trinita players
Association football forwards